The Mandela effect, sometimes referred to as the Mandela phenomenon, is an instance of false collective memory.

Mandela effect may also refer to

Mandela Effect (album), a 2017 remix album by American musician Gonjasufi 
The Mandela Effect (film), a 2019 science fiction film directed by David Guy Levy